Cerbera odollam is a tree species in the family Apocynaceae commonly known as the suicide tree, pong-pong, mintolla, and othalam. It bears a fruit known as othalanga (Malayalam: ഒതളങ്ങ) that yields a potent poison that has been used for suicide and murder.

It is native to South and Southeast Asia and to Queensland, Australia, growing preferentially in coastal salt swamps and in marshy areas but also grown as a hedge plant between home compounds.

Common names  
Cerbera odollam is known by a number of vernacular names, depending on the region. These include othalam (ഒതളം) in the Malayalam language used in Kerala, India; kattu arali (காட்டரளி) in the adjacent state of Tamil Nadu; ডাবুর (Dabur) in Bengali; famentana, kisopo, samanta or tangena in Madagascar; and pong-pong, buta-buta, bintaro or nyan in Southeast Asia.

Description 
Cerbera odollam bears a close resemblance to oleander, another highly toxic plant from the same family. Its branchlets are whorled about the trunk, and its leaves are terminally crowded, with tapering bases, acuminate apices, and entire margins. The plant as a whole yields a milky, white latex.

Its fruit, when still green, looks like a small mango, with a green fibrous shell enclosing an ovoid kernel measuring approximately 2 cm × 1.5 cm and consisting of two cross-matching white fleshy halves. On exposure to air, the white kernel turns violet, then dark grey, and ultimately brown, or black.

Toxicity 
The kernels of C. odollam contain cerberin, a digoxin-type cardenolide and cardiac glycoside toxin that blocks the calcium ion channels in heart muscle, causing disruption of the heart beat, most often fatally. The most common symptom of toxicity in humans was noted to be vomiting. Electrocardiographic abnormalities were noted to be common, the most common being sinus bradycardia. Around half of the patients develop thrombocytopenia. Temporary cardiac pacing has been used in the management, apart from other supportive measures. The difficulty in detecting cerberin in autopsies and the ability of strong spices to mask its taste makes it an agent of homicide and suicide in India; there were more than 500 cases of fatal Cerbera poisoning between 1989 and 1999 in the southern Indian state of Kerala.

A fatal dose of the poison is contained in one kernel, leading to death within 1–2 days.

Common symptoms include: 

burning sensation in mouth
violent vomiting
irregular respiration                                                                  
headache
irregular heartbeat
coma and eventual death

Uses 

The fruits are used for manufacturing bioinsecticides and deodorants.

Investigations have also been made into the feasibility of using the seeds as a feedstock in the production of biodiesel.

See also
 List of poisonous plants

References

odollam
Flora of tropical Asia
Decorative fruits and seeds
Poisonous plants